In commutative algebra, the norm of an ideal is a generalization of a norm of an element in the field extension. It is particularly important in number theory since it measures the size of an ideal of a complicated number ring in terms of an ideal in a less complicated ring. When the less complicated number ring is taken to be the ring of integers, Z, then the norm of a nonzero ideal I of a number ring R is simply the size of the finite quotient ring R/I.

Relative norm 
Let A be a Dedekind domain with field of fractions K and integral closure of B in a finite separable extension L of K.  (this implies that B is also a Dedekind domain.) Let  and  be the ideal groups of A and B, respectively (i.e., the sets of nonzero fractional ideals.) Following the technique developed by Jean-Pierre Serre, the norm map

is the unique group homomorphism that satisfies

for all nonzero prime ideals  of B, where  is the prime ideal of A lying below .

Alternatively, for any  one can equivalently define  to be the fractional ideal of A generated by the set  of field norms of elements of B.

For , one has , where .

The ideal norm of a principal ideal is thus compatible with the field norm of an element:

Let  be a Galois extension of number fields with rings of integers  .

Under this convention the relative norm from  down to  coincides with the absolute norm defined below.

Absolute norm 

By convention, the norm of the zero ideal is taken to be zero.

If  is a principal ideal, then
.

.

Thus the absolute norm extends uniquely to a group homomorphism

The norm of an ideal  can be used to give an upper bound on the field norm of the smallest nonzero element it contains:

there always exists a nonzero  for which

where

  is the number of pairs of (non-real) complex embeddings of  into  (the number of complex places of ).

See also
Field norm
Dedekind zeta function

References

Algebraic number theory
Commutative algebra
Ideals (ring theory)